Brooke Louise Spence (born 4 March 1988) is an Australian football (soccer) player who played for Australian W-League team Brisbane Roar.

Honours

Club
Brisbane Roar:
  W-League Premiership: 2008–09
  W-League Championship: 2008–09

International
Australia
 AFF Women's Championship: 2008

References

Australian women's soccer players
Brisbane Roar FC (A-League Women) players
A-League Women players
1988 births
Living people
Women's association football defenders